Muhammad Maududi Hilmi bin Kasmi is a Bruneian international footballer who plays as a midfielder for Kasuka FC of the Brunei Super League. He has played for professional club DPMM FC for four seasons in the Singaporean S.League.

Club career
Maududi burst into the scene as a young midfielder for DPMM back when they were playing in the Malaysian Super League in 2007. After DPMM was expelled from the S.League in 2008, he became a journeyman in the local leagues, turning out for AH United, KKSJ Penjara (The Prisons Department), Majra FC, and Najip FC. He finally re-signed with DPMM in 2014.

Midway through the following season, Maududi impressed Steve Kean enough to be handed a rare starting berth for the suspended Joe Gamble against Harimau Muda on 12 September 2015. He duly scored the opening goal, his first in the S.League. He became a starting regular in the second half of the season, which ended with DPMM as title-winners.

Maududi was released by DPMM in the 2017 close season. He joined Kasuka FC for the start of the 2018-19 Brunei Super League season. He scored his first goal in an 11–0 victory over Setia Perdana on 29 October.

In Kasuka's opening game of the 2021 Brunei Super League season, Maududi scored four goals in a 1–11 victory over Panchor Murai FC.

Maududi featured extensively in 2022 for Kasuka at the 2022 Brunei FA Cup, scoring the opener in the first leg of the semi-final against MS ABDB. The team went down 2–1 to Maududi's former team DPMM FC in the final on 4 December.

International career

Maududi made his first international appearance for Brunei on 15 May 2008 in the 2008 AFC Challenge Cup qualification held in the Philippines, coming on for Ahmad Hafiz Said in the 53rd minute against Bhutan. His further involvement with the Wasps came in the 2008, 2014 and 2016 editions of the qualifying round of the AFF Suzuki Cup, as well as the 2016 AFC Solidarity Cup.

Honours

Team
DPMM FC
 S.League: 2015
 Singapore League Cup (1): 2014

References

External links

1989 births
Living people
Association football midfielders
Bruneian footballers
Brunei international footballers
DPMM FC players